Paul Annacone and Christo van Rensburg were the defending champions, but Annacone opted to rest to compete at the Davis Cup semi-finals the following week. Van Rensburg teamed up with Eddie Edwards and lost in the first round to Chip Hooper and Mike Leach.

Peter Fleming and John McEnroe won the title by defeating Mike De Palmer and Gary Donnelly 6–4, 7–6(7–2) in the final.

Seeds

Draw

Draw

References

External links
 Official results archive (ATP)
 Official results archive (ITF)

1986 Grand Prix (tennis)